The 1912 Cornell Big Red football team was an American football team that represented Cornell University during the 1912 college football season.  In their first season under head coach Albert Sharpe, the Big Red compiled a 3–7 record and were outscored by their opponents by a combined total of 136 to 63.  No Cornell players received honors on Walter Camp's 1912 College Football All-America Team. However, three Cornell players received All-American honors from others: end John E. O'Hearn (second-team, The Philadelphia Inquirer); guard Jimmie Munns (second-team, The New York Sun); and end Harold R. Eyrick (third-team, The Philadelphia Press).

Schedule

References

Cornel
Cornell Big Red football seasons
Cornell Big Red football